Dead Souls is a 1960 Soviet comedy-drama film directed by Leonid Trauberg based on the Moscow Art Theatre's stage production of "Dead Souls".

Cast
Vladimir Belokurov - Chichikov
Viktor Stanitsyn - Governor
Boris Livanov - Nozdryov
Alexey Gribov - Sobakevich
Anastasia Zuyeva - Korobochka
Boris Petker - Plyushkin
Yuri Leonidov - Manilov
Sophia Garrel - governor
Alexey Zhiltsov - Alexei Ivanovich, Chief of Police
Mikhail Yanshin - Ivan Andreevich, postmaster
Sergei Kalinin - Selifan, Chichikov's coachman
Olga Wicklund - Anna, a lady agreeable in all respects
Lyudmila Makarova - Sophia Ivanovna, simply a nice lady
Victoria Radunskaya - the governor's daughter
Nina Agapova - lady at the ball (uncredited)
Yuri Nikulin - Waiter (uncredited)

References

External links

1960 comedy-drama films
1960 films
Soviet comedy-drama films